The Renault ACx and ADx is a range of light/medium trucks produced by the French manufacturer Renault between 1935 and 1940. From the range derived some buses.

History and technical details
The Renault commercial vehicles for 1936 adopted the styling of its passenger cars, with a curved cabin, a V-shaped, angled grille extending below the bonnet and horizontal slits on the sides of the engine compartment.

Renault ADV
The Renault ADV is a light truck produced between 1936 and 1938. It has a 0.5 tonnes payload and replaced the Renault YN commercial version. Its engine is a 1.46-litre inline-four petrol unit also used by its predecessor and the Renault Celtaquatre. The gearbox is a 3-speed manual unit. The suspension is made of longitudinal springs on front and transversal springs on rear. The dampers are hydraulic on both front and rear. Renault produced a version adapted for right-hand drive markets, mainly the UK, called ADV2.

Renaults ADZ, ACZ and ADK

The Renaults ADZ, ACZ and ADK are closely related light trucks that replaced the KZ, OS and PR ranges. The three models have a 2.38-litre inline-four petrol engine codenamed  85 (the engine would be used on Renault light commercial vehicles until the 1950s). The clutch  is a manually-operated single disc unit. The ACZ and the ADK has double wheels on the rear and a suspension designed for heavier loads than the used on the ADZ. The ADK was the only with servomechanical brakes. The ACZ and the ADK had a 4-speed manual transmission and the ADZ a 3-speed manual. The ADZ has a version for right-hand drive markets called ADZ2. The ADZ has a payload of 0.8 tonnes, the ACZ of 1.3 tonnes, the ADK of 2 tonnes.

The ACZ was produced between 1935 and 1939. The ADZ was produced between 1936 and 1937 and was replaced by the AFR. The ADK was produced between 1936 and 1938 and was replaced by the AGC.

Renault ADH
The Renault ADH is a light truck with a payload between 1 and 2.5 tonnes. It has a 4-speed manual gearbox. The truck was offered in long and short version. For military use, it was mainly produced using the short version, having a  wheelbase, a  length and a  width. The military version of the ADH has a less powerful petrol engine than the civilian ( at 2,350 rpm) and a 5-speed gearbox. In 1940, the ADH replaced its "aerodynamic" grille for a simpler rectangular one.

Renault ADR
The Renault ADR was the last Renault truck that was non-forward control on the 3.5 payload class. It has a 4-speed manual gearbox. The truck was replaced by the AGR.

Buses ADJ and ADN
The Renault ADN is a bus/coach using the 2.38-litre engine of the ADZ/ACZ/ADK family which is able to transport up to 14 passengers. The ADJ is also a bus/coach which could be fitted with either a 4-litre petrol or a 4.7-litre diesel engine. It can carry up to 23 passengers.

Heavy vehicles
The 6.5-tonne payload ADS and the 7.5-tonne ADT are two forward control heavy trucks for 1937 not related to the rest of the range. They were unveiled at the 1936 Paris Salon and both were powered by a 12.5-litre diesel engine. They were replaced by the similarly-looking AGx range from late 1937.

Publications

References

Vehicles introduced in 1935
ACx and ADx